Billom (Auvergnat: Bilhom) is a commune in the Puy-de-Dôme department in the Auvergne-Rhône-Alpes region in central France.

Population

Notable natives
Billom was the birthplace of the philosopher Georges Bataille. It was also the birthplace of Cardinal Hugh Aycelin, OP, who was a 13th-century French Dominican theologian and philosopher, and who served as lector at the Studium Provinciale of Santa Sabina in Rome, this institution being the predecessor of the Pontifical University of Saint Thomas Aquinas (the "Angelicum").

See also
Communes of the Puy-de-Dôme department

References

External links
Visit Billom - Official website for tourism

Communes of Puy-de-Dôme
Auvergne
Puy-de-Dôme communes articles needing translation from French Wikipedia